Hubert de Lapparent (19 April 1919 – 14 September 2021) was a French actor.

Early life and education
Hubert Cochon de Lapparent was born in 1919. He was the son of the geologist Jacques de Lapparent and nephew of the painter Paul de Lapparent. In the 1930s, he entered the conservatory. He participated in the resistance during the Second World War.

References

External links

1919 births
2021 deaths
French nobility
French male actors
French centenarians
Men centenarians
Actors from Strasbourg